Mirkan Aydın (born 8 July 1987) is a German professional footballer who plays as a forward.

Career statistics

References

External links
 

1987 births
German people of Kurdish descent
German people of Turkish descent
People from Hattingen
Sportspeople from Arnsberg (region)
Footballers from North Rhine-Westphalia
Living people
German footballers
Association football forwards
TSG Sprockhövel players
VfL Bochum II players
VfL Bochum players
Eskişehirspor footballers
Göztepe S.K. footballers
Dalkurd FF players
SC Preußen Münster players
Altınordu F.K. players
Hatayspor footballers
İstanbulspor footballers
Ankaraspor footballers
Regionalliga players
Oberliga (football) players
Bundesliga players
2. Bundesliga players
Süper Lig players
TFF First League players
Superettan players
3. Liga players
TFF Second League players
German expatriate footballers
German expatriate sportspeople in Turkey
Expatriate footballers in Turkey
German expatriate sportspeople in Sweden
Expatriate footballers in Sweden